Aleksandr Sergeyevich Budanov (born 27 April 1991) is a Russian former professional football player.

Club career
He made his Russian Premier League debut on 13 March 2010 for FC Krylia Sovetov Samara in a game against FC Zenit St. Petersburg.

External links

References

1991 births
People from Sergiyev Posad
Sportspeople from Moscow Oblast
Living people
Russian footballers
Russia youth international footballers
Russia under-21 international footballers
Russian Premier League players
PFC Krylia Sovetov Samara players
FC Lada-Tolyatti players
FC Tekstilshchik Ivanovo players
Association football midfielders
FC Volga Nizhny Novgorod players
FC Strogino Moscow players